Lekkerbekje is a Dutch fish dish. It is sometimes called the Dutch version of fish and chips
.

Etymology 
Lekkerbekje is a diminuitive of Lekkerbek meaning Gourmand.

Origin 
Lekkerbekje originated in IJmuiden

Composition 
Lekkerbekje consists of a fish fried in batter and deep fried similar to Fish and chips

Originally Lekkerbekje only used Whiting, however now it includes a variety of white fish such as cod, Hake, and Pollock.

Lekkerbekje is often served with fried potatoes and Tartar sauce

See also 

 Kibbeling

References

Seafood
Dutch cuisine